Patryk Peda (born 16 April 2002) is a Polish professional footballer who plays as a centre-back for SPAL.

Club career 
Peda came through the youth ranks of Legia Varsaw, before joining the then Serie A club of SPAL in January 2019, on a loan with an obligation to buy. He eventually joined the club on a permanent basis the following summer.

After a season where he took the spotlight in Primavera, playing 29 games and scoring one goal, Peda made his professional debut for SPAL on 18 September 2021, replacing Riccardo Spaltro during a 2-1 away Serie B defeat against Reggina. A few days after his first game, he extended his contract until June 2024.

International career 
Peda is a youth international with Poland. Having progressed through all the junior teams, he reached the under-20 selection in 2021. He received his first U21 call-up in November 2021.

References

External links

2002 births
Living people
Polish footballers
Poland youth international footballers
Poland under-21 international footballers
Association football defenders
S.P.A.L. players
Serie B players
Polish expatriate footballers
Polish expatriate sportspeople in Italy
Expatriate footballers in Italy